Liza (literally, The Bitch) is a 1972 Italian drama film directed by Marco Ferreri.

Plot
The painter Giorgio lives on an island near the South coast of Corsica, alone with his dog. He is visited by the beautiful Corsican woman Liza, who has an affair with him.

Cast
 Catherine Deneuve as Liza
 Marcello Mastroianni as Giorgio
 Corinne Marchand as Giorgio's wife
 Michel Piccoli as Giorgio's friend
 Pascal Laperrousaz as Giorgio's son
 Dominique Marcas as Maid
 Valérie Stroh as Giorgio's daughter
 Claudia Bianchi
 Enrico Blasi
 Mauro Benedetti
 Claudine Berg as Liza's friend
 Luigi Antonio Guerra

Reception
The film recorded admissions of 293,854 in France.

References

External links

1972 films
Italian drama films
1970s Italian-language films
1972 drama films
Films directed by Marco Ferreri
Films scored by Philippe Sarde
Films shot in Corse-du-Sud
Films set in Corsica
BDSM in films
Films set on uninhabited islands
Films set in the Mediterranean Sea
Films with screenplays by Jean-Claude Carrière
1970s Italian films